Plumpton railway station in Hesket parish in what is now Cumbria but was then Cumberland in the north west of England, was situated on the Lancaster and Carlisle Railway (the West Coast Main Line) between Carlisle and Penrith. It served the village of Plumpton and the surrounding hamlets. The station opened on 17 December 1846, and closed on 31 May 1948.

The station
The station was situated in the part of the village called Brockleymoor and had two platforms, a signal box, a station master's house and railway workers' cottages. The relatively sizeable goods yard had a weighing machine, crane, coal yard and cattle pens. The station house and goods yard buildings remain as a pottery outlet, but the platforms have been demolished. The line through the station site has been electrified and becomes triple-tracked at that point for a short distance towards Carlisle.

Stations on the line
The next station on the line towards Carlisle was Calthwaite and the preceding station was Penrith.

References
Notes

Sources

External links
Old Cumbria Gazetteer

Disused railway stations in Cumbria
Railway stations in Great Britain opened in 1846
Railway stations in Great Britain closed in 1948
Former Lancaster and Carlisle Railway stations
1846 establishments in England